Thomas Frederick Davies or Bishop Davies may refer to:

Thomas Frederick Davies (father) (1831–1905), third bishop of the Episcopal Diocese of Michigan, 1889–1905
Thomas Frederick Davies Jr. (1872–1936), second bishop of the Episcopal Diocese of Western Massachusetts, 1911–1936

See also
Thomas Davies (disambiguation)